Moïta is a commune in the Haute-Corse department, on the island of Corsica, France.

Administration
Moïta was the seat of the former canton of Moïta-Verde, which included 13 other communes: Aléria, Ampriani, Campi, Canale-di-Verde, Chiatra, Linguizzetta, Matra, Pianello, Pietra-di-Verde, Tallone, Tox, Zalana and Zuani. Since 2015, it is part of the canton of Ghisonaccia.

Geography
It was part of the ancient parish of Serra. Its territory is split between mountain and plain.

Population

See also
Communes of the Haute-Corse department

References

Communes of Haute-Corse
Haute-Corse communes articles needing translation from French Wikipedia